Boldness is the opposite of shyness. To be bold implies a willingness to get things done despite risks. Boldness may be a property that only certain individuals are able to display.

For example, in the context of sociability, a bold person may be willing to risk shame or rejection in social situations, or to bend rules of etiquette or politeness. An excessively bold person could aggressively ask for money, or persistently push someone to fulfill a request.

The word "bold" may also be used as a synonym of "impudent"; for example, a child may be punished for being "bold" by acting disrespectfully toward an adult or by misbehaving.

Boldness may be contrasted with courage in that the latter implies having fear but confronting it.

History

Words of Spartan admiral from 405 BC, Lysander, from "Tides of War": “The bold man is prideful, brazen, ambitious,”, “The brave man calm, God-fearing, steady.”, “Boldness honors two things only: novelty and success. It feeds on them and without them dies.”, “Boldness is impatient. Courage is long-suffering. Boldness cannot endure hardship or delay; it is ravenous, it must feed on victory or it dies. Boldness makes its seat upon the air; it is gossamer and phantom. Courage plants its feet upon the earth and draws its strength from God’s holy fundament.”, “The enemy’s weakness is time. Thrasytes is perishable. It is like that fruit, luscious when ripe, which stinks to heaven when it rots.” and “Those qualities most pleasing to heaven, we believe, are courage to endure and contempt for death.”

Description 
In behavioral ecology, the shy-bold continuum is studied to exist in humans and certain other species. Shyness and boldness represent "a propensity to take risks". Bold individuals tend to become dominant, revealing a correlation between boldness and social dominance.

See also

Assertiveness
Chutzpah
Courage
Disinhibition
Shyness
Sisu
Psychopathy
Parrhesia

References 

Psychological attitude
Virtue